FHR Fred Robertson Los Angeles Pottery was a small studio art pottery manufacturer in Los Angeles, California, from approximately 1906 to approximately 1921.

Background 
Fred H. Robertson and his father, Alexander, were important figures in the art pottery movement in America. Alexander, a fifth generation potter, had founded Chelsea Keramic Art Works (Chelsea, Massachusetts) in 1866 (or 1867), its successor, Dedham Pottery (Dedham, Massachusetts) in 1896, and the Roblin Art Pottery (San Francisco) in 1898.  Fred worked at Chelsea and then Dedham. Other Robertson family members worked at Chelsea and Dedham, including Alexander's brother, Hugh. Dedham is known for its crackle (craquelure) and volcanic glazes, and blue cobalt hand painted designs. 
 
In 1903 Fred moved to California and joined Alexander at Roblin. The name Roblin came from the names of its founders, Robertson and Linna Irelan. Fred moved to Los Angeles in 1906 and worked for LA Pressed Brick until 1921 as its superintendent.  At LA Pressed Brick Fred won medals for his crystalline and lustered glazes.

Formation of the studio  
From approximately 1906 until approximately 1921 Fred also operated a small art pottery studio in Los Angeles known as "FHR Fred Robertson Los Angeles." FHR is best known for its crackle, matte, crystalline and lustered glazes. The crackle finish was a well known Robertson development from the Chelsea/Dedham period, inspired by the Oriental pottery seen by Hugh Robertson at the Centennial Exposition. The pottery is typically marked on the bottom with a stamped or incised "FHR" or "FHR Los Angeles."

In 1921 Fred, along with Gus Larson of LA Pressed Brick, moved to Claycraft Potteries Company (Los Angeles), which was established that year. Claycraft is known to have been located at 3101 San Fernando Road. Fred was the general superintendent of Claycraft, focusing on the development of bodies and glazes. George B. Robertson, Fred's son, joined the firm as a designer in 1925. Claycraft is well known for its decorative tiles,  garden pottery, fountains and lamp bases. The body of work achieved at Claycraft is largely credited to the skill and attention of the two Robertsons. In 1934 the two departed to form Robertson/Hollywood Pottery. The last mention of Claycraft Potteries is found in Los Angeles city directories of 1939. 
 
Robertson/Hollywood Pottery was located in Los Angeles California at a time when many of the better potters were moving west. Robertson/Hollywood made household pottery items such as plates and covered boxes. Robertson/Hollywood pottery is typically marked on the bottom with incised script "Robertson/Hollywood."
 
Robertson/Hollywood Pottery closed in 1952.

References
 Rago, D. and Perrault, S. (2001) American Art Pottery, Citadel Press.

American art pottery
Manufacturing companies based in Los Angeles
Art in Greater Los Angeles
American companies established in 1906
Design companies established in 1906
Manufacturing companies established in 1906
Manufacturing companies disestablished in 1921
1906 establishments in California
1921 disestablishments in California
Defunct manufacturing companies based in Greater Los Angeles
Design companies disestablished in 1921